Heritage Christian School is a private Baptist Christian school in Kissimmee, Florida for students K-12th grade. It is a ministry of Bible Baptist church and located on church property in east Kissimmee, Florida. As of 2005, their attendance was at 635 students. They currently have forty-three teachers. The Schools colors are red, blue and white

The Heritage Christian School uses the Abeka Book program for all subjects except science.

External links 
 Official site

Baptist schools in the United States
Christian schools in Florida
High schools in Osceola County, Florida
Private high schools in Florida
Private middle schools in Florida
Private elementary schools in Florida
Schools in Kissimmee, Florida